Talwandi Pain  is a village in Kapurthala district of Punjab State, India. The village is administrated by a Sarpanch, who is an elected representative.

Demography 
According to the report published by Census India in 2011, Talwandi Pain has 117 houses with total population of 630 persons of which 334 are male and 296 females. Literacy rate of Talwandi Pain is 76.43%, higher than the state average of 75.84%.  The population of children in the age group 0–6 years is 53 which is 8.41% of total population. Child sex ratio is approximately 828, lower than the state average of 846.

Population data

References

External links
  Villages in Kapurthala
 Kapurthala Villages List

Villages in Kapurthala district